Franco Ferreiro (born July 1, 1984) is a Brazilian former professional tennis player. He qualified for the 2009 French Open, but lost to Feliciano López in five sets in the first round after leading two sets to love.

Career finals

ATP World Tour finals

Doubles: 2 (0–2)

Challenger Titles

Doubles (19)

References

External links 
 

1984 births
Living people
Brazilian male tennis players
Sportspeople from Porto Alegre
People from Rio Grande do Sul
South American Games medalists in tennis
South American Games bronze medalists for Brazil
Competitors at the 2002 South American Games
21st-century Brazilian people
20th-century Brazilian people